Unhavare is a small village in Dappoli Taluka of Ratnagiri District. [Maharashtra] state in Western India. The 2011 Census of India recorded a total of 138 residents in the village.
Approach road to this village is from Vakavli, on Dapoli to Khed Road.
There are natural hot water springs at this village.

References

Villages in Ratnagiri district